Srivichai Football Club (Thai สโมสรฟุตบอลศรีวิชัย), is a Thai football club based in Surat Thani, Thailand. The club is currently playing in the 2018 Thailand Amateur League Southern Region.

Record

Current squad

References

 
 
 อายุเป็นเพียงตัวเลข! "น้ามัน" วัย 52 สร้างสถิติค้าแข้งอายุมากที่สุดในไทย! ประกาศสวมสตั๊ดลุยลีกอาชีพ โวพา ศรีวิชัยบู๊อเมเจอร์ลีก
 “น้ามัน อภิชาติ”อดีตแข้งทีมชาติ เตรียมลงเตะบอลอีกครั้งด้วยวัย 52 ปี  | ข่าวช่อง 8

External links
 Facebook Page

Association football clubs established in 2014
Football clubs in Thailand
Sport in Chonburi province
2014 establishments in Thailand